Tea Tree Gully was an electoral district of the House of Assembly in the Australian state of South Australia from 1970 to 1977. The suburb of Tea Tree Gully has since been represented by the seat of Newland.

Member

Election results

References 

Former electoral districts of South Australia
1970 establishments in Australia
1977 disestablishments in Australia